Fallisia siamense is a parasite in the family Garniidae.

Description 

The parasite was first described by Telford in 1986.

Geographical occurrence 

This species is found in Thailand.

Vectors

Not known.

Clinical features and host pathology 

The only known host for this species is the flying lizard Draco maculatus.

References 

Haemosporida
Parasites of lizards